Cían, modern spelling Cian, is a Gaelic given name meaning "ancient".

People 
 Cian Bolger (born 1992), Irish footballer
 Cian Ciaran (born 1976), Welsh musician
 Cian Dillon (born 1988), Irish hurler
 Kian Egan (born 1980), Irish musician
 Kian Emadi-Coffin (born 1992), British cyclist
 Kian Hansen (born 1989), Danish football player
 Cian Healy (born 1987), Irish rugby union player
 Cian Hughton (born 1989), British-Irish footballer
 Kian Lawley (born 1995), American YouTuber and actor
 Cian Maciejewski (born 1988), Australian soccer player
 Cian McCarthy (born 1989), Irish hurler
 Cian Melia, Irish showjumper
 Cian O'Callaghan, Irish Social Democrats politician
 Cian O'Connor (born 1979), Irish equestrian
 Cian O'Connor (hurler) (born 1983), Irish hurler
 Cian O'Neill, Irish hurling coach
 Cian O'Sullivan, Irish footballer
 Cian Ward, Irish footballer
 Cian Ducrot (born 1997), singer-songwriter

History and mythology 
 Cian, father of Lug Lámfhota
 Cian d'Fhearaibh Bolg, last King of the Senchineoil of Magh Senchineoil, now in County Galway
 Cian mac Máelmuaid, son of Máel Muad mac Brain, who was twice King of Munster
 Saint Cian, sixth century Welsh saint
 Cian, a Leinster hero

See also 
 
 
 Kian (given name)
 Kyan (name)
 Empress Dowager Ci'an

References 

Irish masculine given names